Frans Westergren (20 April 1914 – 2 March 1993) was a Swedish wrestler. He competed in the men's freestyle welterweight at the 1948 Summer Olympics.

References

External links
 

1914 births
1993 deaths
Swedish male sport wrestlers
Olympic wrestlers of Sweden
Wrestlers at the 1948 Summer Olympics
Sportspeople from Malmö